The following highways are numbered 982:

Canada

United States